Hong Ji-yoon  is a South Korean actress. She is best known for her roles in television series My First First Love (2019) and Woori the Virgin (2022).

Career
Hong Ji-yoon made her debut in tvN's Criminal Minds in 2017, as Park In-hye. She also starred in Bad Guys 2.

She played the role of Oh Ji-ran in What's Wrong with Secretary Kim. She played a supporting role in Netflix's original series My First First Love with Ji Soo, Jung Chae-yeon and Jin Young. She made a cameo appeared as actress Ruby in My Absolute Boyfriend.

Hong Ji-yoon has also partaken in the drama My Country which premiered in September 2019 on JTBC. In 2022, she starred in the SBS romantic comedy drama Woori the Virgin.

In January 2023, Hong signed with Ghost Studio.

Filmography

Film

Television series

Awards and nominations

References

External links
Hong Ji-yoon  at KeyEast  

1991 births
Living people
South Korean television actresses
South Korean film actresses
South Korean television presenters
South Korean women television presenters
21st-century South Korean actresses